Huangacocha (possibly from Quechua wanka, wank'a, wankha rock, stone, qucha lake, "rock lake") or Huangagocha, is a lake in the La Libertad Region in Peru.

See also
List of lakes in Peru

References

Lakes of Peru
Lakes of La Libertad Region